The 1925–26 season was the 52nd season of competitive football by the Rangers.

Overview

Results
All results are written with Rangers' score first.

Scottish League Division One

Scottish Cup

Appearances

See also
 1925–26 in Scottish football
 1925–26 Scottish Cup

Rangers F.C. seasons
Rangers